The 1946 FA Cup final was the 65th final of the FA Cup, and the first after World War II. It took place on 27 April 1946 at Wembley Stadium and was contested between Derby County and Charlton Athletic.

Derby won the match 4–1 after extra time. Charlton's Bert Turner scored an own goal and then scored for his own team, thus becoming the first player to score for both sides in an FA Cup Final. Goals from Peter Doherty and Jackie Stamps (2) in the extra-time period gave Derby their first, and so far only, FA Cup triumph.

Match summary
The game was goalless until the 85th minute, when a cross from the right was punched out by goalkeeper Sam Bartram, but it went straight to Dally Duncan who shot goalwards; Bert Turner tried to kick the ball clear, but only managed to deflect the ball into his own net. In the next minute, Turner scored for his own side when he took a free-kick from the edge of the Rams’ penalty area and, although goalkeeper Vic Woodley appeared to have the shot well covered, the ball struck a Derby player and was deflected past Woodley into the opposite corner of the net to which he was diving.

Turner thus became the first player to score for both sides in an FA Cup Final, subsequently repeated by Tommy Hutchison in 1981 and Gary Mabbutt in 1987. At the age of 36 years 312 days, Turner also became the oldest player to score in an FA Cup Final.

The match finished level after 90 minutes, but, in extra time, Derby County scored three goals to win the match 4–1.

When Stamps shot for goal in the closing minutes of normal time, the ball burst en route. Stamps went on to score twice with the new ball as Derby beat Charlton Athletic 4–1. A week earlier, when the same sides had met in the League, the match ball had also burst.

The players in the 1946 Cup final were awarded two medals each. Due to a shortage of gold following the Second World War, the two teams were initially presented with bronze medals (winners and runners-up) on the day, and subsequently awarded the proper gold versions when gold became more readily available later that year.

The last surviving player from the game, Derby's Reg Harrison, died on 17 September 2020.

Match details

References

External links
1946 FA Cup Final Report from the Derby Evening Telegraph
FA Cup Final kits 1946–49
Match report from www.fa-cupfinals.co.uk
Full match programme reproduced online

FA Cup Finals
Final
FA Cup Final 1946
FA Cup Final 1946
April 1946 sports events in the United Kingdom
FA Cup Final
Events at Wembley Stadium